Air Charter Service (ACS) is a global aircraft charter provider with 29 offices around the world in Australia, Brazil, Canada, China, France, Germany, Hong Kong, India, Kazakhstan, Singapore, South Africa, Spain, Switzerland, UAE, UK, and USA.

As a brokerage, Air Charter Service does not own any aircraft, but arranges helicopter, private jet, commercial airline, and cargo aircraft charters. Additional services include Jet Cards for its private jets division, Onboard Couriers and Travel & Concierge.

History 
In 1990, from a basement in the UK town of Kingston upon Thames, Chris Leach set about creating Air Charter Service (ACS).

In 2015 Air Charter Service announced that it would be investing £10 million ($15 million) in charter technology over the course of the next five years.

Chronology 
1990 In the basement of Chris Leach's house, ACS is born.

1993 ACS gets involved in relief operations following Somalia's civil war. Chris Leach works on the ground in war-torn Mogadishu.

1994 ACS charters a number of An-124 aircraft to Rwanda to deliver aid following the genocide.

1995 ACS opens its first overseas offices in Moscow, Russia and an operations base for its new managed fleet in Ostend, Belgium.

1999 On behalf of the Red Cross, ACS creates an air bridge in Kosovo.

2001 ACS rushes aid to Bangladesh following monsoon floods.

2004 ACS expands into the US with the opening of the New York office.

2005 Following the Indian Ocean tsunami, ACS gets heavily involved in completing relief charters and positioning helicopters on long-term lease. ACS enters the Middle Eastern market by opening an office in Dubai.

2006 In response to the Pakistan earthquake, ACS arranges helicopters for the British Government, as well as many other charters for relief agencies.

2007 ACS expands its European presence, opening offices in Spain.

2008 ACS establishes a foothold in the Asian market with an operation in Hong Kong.

2009 ACS continues its continental expansion, opening an office in South Africa and also increases its European presence with an office in France.

2010 ACS opens four new offices in Germany, Canada, Brazil and a second one for Russia in St Petersburg. 100 cargo and passenger charters are organised to deliver aid and key personnel to Haiti following the devastating earthquake. Following the volcanic ash cloud from Iceland hundreds of aircraft are chartered after European airspace reopens.

2011 ACS expands its coverage in USA, with the opening of the Los Angeles office. Over 15,000 people evacuated from Libya, Egypt and Tunisia on ACS chartered aircraft.

2012 Launch of the jet card division and subsequent products. ACS opens offices in India, China and Kazakhstan ACS arranges regular civilian passenger flights between the UK and the Falkland Islands, coordinating regular rotations throughout the year.

2014 ACS expands within North America, opening an office in Houston, Texas.

2015 This year marks the 25th anniversary of the company's formation. ACS announces a major investment an onboard courier / hand-carry division. ACS opens a new office in Miami, USA and a Swiss office in Geneva.

2016 ACS expands into a sixth continent, opening a new office in Sydney, Australia. ACS helps coordinate a 48 sector, six continent world tour for heavy metal band, Iron Maiden.

2018 ACS opens offices in Manhattan and San Francisco.

2019 ACS opens an office in Atlanta.

2020 ACS opens offices in Singapore and Chicago.

Websites 
The company has websites covering 34 countries (in a total of 11 languages): Angola, Argentina, Australia, Bolivia, Brazil, Canada, Chile, China, Colombia, Democratic Republic of the Congo, France, Germany, Hong Kong, India, Indonesia, Ireland, Kenya, Mexico, Namibia, Nigeria, Peru, Republic of Korea, Saudi Arabia, Singapore, South Africa, Spain, Switzerland, Turkey, UAE, UK, Uruguay, USA and Venezuela.

References

Transport companies established in 1990
1990 establishments in the United Kingdom